Alejandro "Álex" Marco Craninx Joostens (born 21 October 1995) is a professional footballer who plays as a goalkeeper, for CF Fuenlabrada. Born in Spain, he has represented Belgium at youth level.

Club career

Real Madrid
Born in Málaga, Andalusia, Craninx joined Real Madrid's La Fábrica in 2011, from UD Marbella. He made his senior debut with the C-team on 5 October 2014, starting in a 1–1 Tercera División home draw against AD Unión Adarve.

On 15 July 2015, Craninx renewed his contract and was promoted to the B-team in Segunda División B, but acted as a backup to Alfonso Herrero and Carlos Abad during his spell.

Sparta Rotterdam
On 25 July 2017, Craninx signed for Sparta Rotterdam, but was assigned to the reserve side in the Tweede Divisie.

Cartagena
On 31 January 2018, Craninx returned to Spain after agreeing to a six-month contract with third division side FC Cartagena.

Molde
On 27 July 2018, Craninx agreed a two and a half year deal with Norwegian club Molde. He made his first team debut in the Molde's Norwegian Cup first round match against Eide/Omegn on 1 May 2019, a game Molde won 5−0. He got his league debut on 26 May in Molde's 1−2 loss against Tromsø on 26 May 2019. He made his debut in UEFA competitions in Molde's 7–1 win over KR in the UEFA Europa League first qualifying round on 11 July 2019. He played 14 games and kept a clean sheet in four of them in the club's title-winning 2019 season. Craninx got 25 appearances in all competitions. On 3 December 2019, Molde announced that Craninx had agreed to an extension of his contract that will keep him at the club until the end of the 2023 season. 

On 31 January 2022, Craninx was loaned to Seraing until the end of the season.

On 31 January 2023, Craninx was released by Molde.

CF Fuenlabrada
On 8 February 2023, Craninx signed for CF Fuenlabrada on a short-term contract until the end of the season.

International career
Craninx has played a total of 6 games for Belgium at international youth level.

Career statistics

Club

Honours
Molde
Eliteserien: 2019

References

External links

1995 births
Living people
Footballers from Málaga
Belgian footballers
Belgium youth international footballers
Spanish footballers
Spanish people of Belgian descent
Association football goalkeepers
Segunda División B players
Tercera División players
Real Madrid C footballers
Real Madrid Castilla footballers
FC Cartagena footballers
Molde FK players
R.F.C. Seraing (1922) players
CF Fuenlabrada footballers
Belgian expatriate footballers
Belgian expatriate sportspeople in the Netherlands
Belgian expatriate sportspeople in Norway
Spanish expatriate footballers
Spanish expatriate sportspeople in the Netherlands
Spanish expatriate sportspeople in Norway
Expatriate footballers in the Netherlands
Expatriate footballers in Norway